Hirvijärvi Reservoir is medium-sized lake in the Lapuanjoki main catchment area. It is located in the region Southern Ostrobothnia, in the municipality of Seinäjoki, Finland.

See also
List of lakes in Finland

References

Reservoirs in Finland
Lakes of Seinäjoki